Reyepara is a village, in Nandigram II CD Block in Haldia subdivision of Purba Medinipur district in the state of West Bengal, India.

Geography

CD block HQ
The headquarters of Nandigram II CD block are located at Reyepara.

Urbanisation
79.19% of the population of Haldia subdivision live in the rural areas. Only 20.81% of the population live in the urban areas, and that is the highest proportion of urban population amongst the four subdivisions in Purba Medinipur district.

Note: The map alongside presents some of the notable locations in the subdivision. All places marked in the map are linked in the larger full screen map.

Demographics
As per 2011 Census of India Reyepara had a total population of 3,059 of which 1,528 (50%) were males and 1,531 (50%) were females. Population below 6 years was 321. The total number of literates in Reyepara was 2,439 (89.08% of the population over 6 years).

Transport
The Chandipur-Nandigram Road passes through Reyepara.

Healthcare
Reapara Rural Hospital at Reapara (with 30 beds) is the main medical facility in Nandigram II CD block. There are primary health centres at Boyal (with 6 beds) and Amdabad (with 10 beds).

References

Villages in Purba Medinipur district